Grucia is a genus of moths in the subfamily Arctiinae. It contains the single species Grucia monacheicauda, which is found in Mexico.

References

Natural History Museum Lepidoptera generic names catalog

Lithosiini